Markus Zusak (born 23 June 1975) is an Australian writer with Austrian and German roots. He is best known for The Book Thief and The Messenger (US title: I Am the Messenger), two novels which became international bestsellers. He won the Margaret A. Edwards Award in 2014.

Early life and     career
Zusak was born in Sydney, Australia. His mother Lisa is originally from Germany and his father Helmut is from Austria. They emigrated to Australia in the late 1950s. Markus is the youngest of four children and has two sisters and one brother. He attended Engadine High School and briefly returned there to teach English while writing. He studied English and history at the University of New South Wales, from which he graduated with a Bachelor of Arts and a Diploma of Education.

Zusak is the author of six books. His first three books, The Underdog, Fighting Ruben Wolfe, and When Dogs Cry, released between 1999 and 2001, were all published internationally. The Messenger, published in 2002, won the 2003 CBC Book of the Year Award (Older Readers) and the 2003 NSW Premier's Literary Award (Ethel Turner Prize) in Australia and was a runner-up for the Printz Award in America.

The Book Thief was published in 2005 and has since been translated into more than 40 languages. The Book Thief was adapted as a film of the same name in 2013. In 2014, Zusak delivered a Ted Talk, called 'The Failurist' at the Sydney Opera House. It focused on his drafting process and journey to success through writing The Book Thief.

The Messenger (I Am the Messenger in the United States) was published in 2002 and was one of Zusak's first novels. This novel has won awards such as the New South Wales Premier's Literary Awards: Ethel Turner Prize for Young People's Literature.

In March 2016 Zusak talked about his then unfinished novel yippee Bridge of Clay. He stated that the book was 90% finished but that, "... I’m a completely different person than the person who wrote The Book Thief. And this is also the scary thing—I’m a different person to the one who started Bridge of Clay eight, nine years ago ...  I’ve got to get it done this year, or else I’ll probably finally have to set it aside."

Works 
 The Underdog (1999)
 Fighting Ruben Wolfe (2000), sequel to The Underdog
 When Dogs Cry (2001), a.k.a. Getting the Girl; sequel to Fighting Ruben Wolfe
 The Messenger (2002); US title: I Am the Messenger
 The Book Thief (2005)
 Bridge of Clay (2018), Pan Macmillan Australia

Awards 
In 2014, Zusak won the Margaret A. Edwards Award from the American Library Association (ALA), which annually recognises an author and "a specific body of his or her work, for significant and lasting contribution to young adult literature".

In 2006, Zusak was also the recipient of the Sydney Morning Herald's Young Australian Novelist of the Year Award.

 The Book Thief
2006: Kathleen Mitchell Award 2006 (literature)
2006: National Jewish Book Award (Children's and Young Adult Literature)
2007: Michael L. Printz Award runner-up (Honor Book) from the US Young Adult Library Services Association (YALSA)
2008: Ena Noel Award – the IBBY Australia Ena Noël Encouragement Award for Children's Literature
2009: Deutscher Jugendliteraturpreis
 The Messenger (US title: I Am The Messenger)
2003: New South Wales Premier's Literary Awards Ethel Turner Prize for Young People's Literature
2003: Children's Book Council of Australia Book of the Year Award
2005: Publishers Weekly Best Books of the Year-Children
2006: Bulletin Blue Ribbon Book
2006: Printz Award Honor Book
2007: Deutscher Jugendliteraturpreis
 When Dogs Cry / Getting the Girl
2002: Honour Book, CBCA Children's Book of the Year Award: Older Readers
 Fighting Ruben Wolfe
2001: Honour Book, CBCA Children's Book of the Year Award: Older Readers
shortlisted for the New South Wales Premier's Literary Awards Ethel Turner Prize for Young People's Literature

References

 
1975 births
20th-century Australian novelists
21st-century Australian novelists
Australian children's writers
Australian male novelists
Margaret A. Edwards Award winners
Writers from Sydney
Australian people of Austrian descent
Australian people of German descent
Living people
20th-century Australian male writers
21st-century Australian male writers
University of New South Wales alumni